MEQ may refer to:

 Middle East Quarterly, a quarterly journal
 Milliequivalents, a quantity used for chemical reactions
 Morningness–eveningness questionnaire, used to assess circadian rhythm
 Cut Nyak Dhien Airport (IATA code), located in Nagan Raya Regency, Aceh, Indonesia